Sayyid Hussein el-Husseini (15 April 1937 – 11 January 2023) was a Lebanese statesman who served as speaker of the Lebanese parliament, and whose efforts in brokering and fathering the Taif Agreement led to the end of the Lebanese Civil War in 1990. 

El-Husseini, as co-founder of the Amal Movement, is regarded as one of the founders of the Lebanese resistance. He succeeded Musa al-Sadr as leader of the Amal Movement, but resigned from his position in 1980 as he was opposed to Amal becoming increasingly more involved in the civil war.

He was widely respected for his integrity and was considered to be a wise and fair leader who always prioritized the higher interests of his country. His contributions to Lebanese politics and the upholding of the rule of law were widely recognized, and he was eulogized as "Lebanon's last hero" following his death.

Early life and political career
Born on 15 April 1937 in Zahlé into a prominent Shia family, Hussein El-Husseini is one of the founders of the Movement of the Deprived that later gave birth to Amal, of which he, along with Imam Musa al-Sadr, is the co-founder. He was the closest collaborator and backer of al-Sadr at the head of Amal, serving at first as head of Amal's political wing, as well as in the Supreme Shiite Council, of which he became a founding member in 1972.

El-Husseini was elected member of parliament in 1972, at the age of 35, after being mayor of his hometown Shmustar at 18. From 1972 to 1974, he headed the parliamentary commission of public works and hydroelectric resources. He became, since 1972, member of the parliamentary financial and budgetary commission.

In 1978, he became Amal's Secretary General. He resigned from this post on 17 June 1980, as he refused to drench Amal in blood and fight alongside the PLO or any other faction. His resignation was followed by Amal's entry in the Lebanese Civil War.

In October 1984, he was elected Speaker of the Parliament by members of parliament and remained in this post until October 1992, after serving 4 consecutive two-year terms. In 1989, while in office, el-Husseini orchestrated and presided over the Taif Agreement, held in the Kingdom of Saudi Arabia, which led to the end of the Lebanese Civil War (1975–1990). He is considered to be the father of the agreement. Husseini is also credited with revoking both the Cairo Agreement and the May 17 Agreement.

In 1992, Nabih Berri was backed by the Syrians during their military presence in Lebanon to replace Husseini as Speaker, as Husseini had refused, despite enormous pressure, to pass a law that would allow Rafik Hariri (and later Solidere) to expropriate land and property in the Beirut Central District and compensate owners with shares in the company worth as little as 15% of the property's value.

On 12 August 2008, in a speech during the vote of confidence for the new government, Husseini announced his resignation from parliament, expressing his fury at how the constitution was being torn.

El-Husseini remained a strong advocate of democracy, civil society and transparency in his community. Husseini's Civil Center for National Initiative succeeded in persuading the Ministry of Interior to allow Lebanese citizens to remove mentions of their sectarian affiliation from civil records.

Death 
On 11 January 2023, el-Husseini passed away. He was buried in his hometown of Shmustar in a state funeral, with thousands of mourners, including much of the political class and cabinet, in attendance. Caretaker Prime Minister Najib Mikati declared a three-day national mourning period. 

El-Husseini was eulogized and mourned by politicians from across the political spectrum. According to the Washington Post, “his stature in Lebanon was reflected by the warm tributes from factions he once denounced”.

Legacy 
Nicknamed Abu t-Taif (Father of the Taif Agreement) or ʿArrab at-Taif (Godfather of the Taif Agreement) for his role in fathering the peace accords that ended the Lebanese Civil War, el-Husseini was strongly and actively opposed to Lebanon's sectarian political system, and was a leading critic of Lebanon's post-war Hariri-led governments' economic and fiscal policies that eventually led to the Lebanese liquidity crisis, which became apparent in 2019. He enjoyed wide respect for his integrity and for being one of very few politicians in Lebanon not involved in the country's endemic corruption. 

Widely known as "the guardian of the Lebanese Constitution and the rule of law", he was described as belonging "to that rare class of Lebanese political leaders who refused to safeguard their top positions by bloodying their hands" and as "one of the few Lebanese politicians who always refused Lebanon’s subordination to foreign powers". 

Lebanese statesman Raymond Eddé famously nicknamed him the "seventh pillar of Baalbek's Temple of Jupiter", while Lebanese nationalist poet Said Akl wrote, in 1972, that el-Husseini's "presence in parliament compensates for the backwardness of parliament" and that he would "from now on, know the value of parliament based on whether or not el-Husseini is participating in it".

Palestinian historian Tarif Khalidi wrote of him: 
The “Sayyid” embodied in his person true patriotism, was a maker of his country’s constitution and loyal to it, well-versed in his knowledge of its laws and legislation, insightful into the higher interests of his country, majestic, dignified, wise, fair in presiding over his parliament, skilled in his speech and logic. Arab causes, especially Palestine, had always been very close to his heart.

Despite all of this, he was an aristocrat without bravado, with great humility and above doing harm. [He was a man] of dignity coupled with amiability, of sincerity to his friends, with kindness and endearing humor. He had a low, or rather, soft voice, and an amazing physiognomy that he undoubtedly inherited from his ancestor [the Prophet Muhammad].

Following his death, he was eulogized as "Lebanon's last hero" and as a "champion of a Lebanese civil state - perhaps the last such champion Lebanon will know".

See also
List of speakers of the Parliament of Lebanon

References

1937 births
2023 deaths
People from Zahle
Lebanese Shia Muslims
Legislative speakers of Lebanon
Members of the Parliament of Lebanon
Amal Movement politicians